Daniel Burgess (23 October 1896 – 1983) was an English professional footballer who played as an inside forward.

Career
Burgess played for local side Goldenhill Wanderers, before joining Port Vale in December 1918 after leaving the army. He scored one his debut at inside-right in a 3–1 victory over Manchester United in a Football League Lancashire Section match at the Old Recreation Ground on 14 December 1918. He scored a total of four goals in seven games for the "Valeites", before moving on to Arsenal in February 1919. He spent three seasons at Highbury, scoring one goal from 13 First Division games. He spent the 1922–23 season with West Ham United, but featured in just two Second Division matches. He finally found regular first-team football at Aberdare Athletic, scoring 24 goals in 77 Third Division South across the 1923–24 and 1924–25 campaigns. He returned to London to play for Queens Park Rangers, scoring 8 eight goals in 32 Third Division South fixtures across the 1925–26 campaign. However he fell out favour at Loftus Road during the 1926–27 season and left the Football League, spending the remainder of the decade in non-league circles at Sittingbourne, Dartford and Sheppey United.

Career statistics
Source:

References

1896 births
1983 deaths
People from Goldenhill
English footballers
Association football inside forwards
Port Vale F.C. players
Arsenal F.C. players
West Ham United F.C. players
Aberdare Athletic F.C. players
Queens Park Rangers F.C. players
Sittingbourne F.C. players
Dartford F.C. players
Sheppey United F.C. players
English Football League players
Southern Football League players
British Army personnel of World War I